"Un'estate italiana" (Italian), "To be number one" (English) or "Un verano italiano" (Spanish; both meaning "An Italian summer") is the official song of the 1990 FIFA World Cup held in Italy. The song was composed by Giorgio Moroder with lyrics by Tom Whitlock. The Italian version, also known as "Notti magiche" ("Magical nights") in Italy, was recorded by Italian artists Edoardo Bennato and Gianna Nannini, who also wrote the Italian lyrics. The Spanish version, also known as "Noches mágicas" in Spanish, was recorded by Paraguayan Susan Ferrer, who also wrote the Spanish lyrics.

The song achieved success on the charts of several European countries.

Release
For the Italian release, Moroder addressed Gianna Nannini and Edoardo Bennato, who rewrote the lyrics and took the song to the top of the charts in Italy and Switzerland. From January to September 1990, the song was the best-selling single in Italy. The song was presented for the first time by the two singer-songwriters in Milan in December 1989, and performed live during the opening ceremony, held on 8 June 1990, in Milan, before the Argentina–Cameroon opening match, followed later also by the English version. It describes the desire to win, and score a goal.

The song was among the first to contain a single instrumental version (indicated as a karaoke version) and to be published as a maxi single.

English version 
The English version, released under the name "To Be Number One", and performed by Giorgio Moroder Project (Singers: Joe Milner, Moll Anderson, Paula Mulcahy Keane) was the opening theme to RAI TV programmes and matches related to the 1990 FIFA World Cup.

Cover versions 
In 1990, Hong Kong singer Alan Tam covered this song in Cantonese under the title "Ideals and Peace".

In 2014, The Italian Tenors covered this song.

Track listings
 7" single
 "Un'estate italiana" – 4:07
 "Un'estate italiana" (karaoke version) – 4:07

 12" maxi
 "Un'estate italiana" (stadium version) – 4:50
 "Un'estate italiana" (7" version) – 4:07
 "Un'estate italiana" (karaoke version) – 4:07

 CD maxi
 "Un'estate italiana" (stadium version) – 4:50
 "Un'estate italiana" (single version) – 4:07
 "Un'estate italiana" (karaoke version) – 4:07

Charts and sales

Peak positions

Year-end charts

Certifications

See also 
 List of FIFA World Cup songs and anthems

References

1989 songs
1990 singles
Edoardo Bennato songs
FIFA World Cup official songs and anthems
Gianna Nannini songs
Number-one singles in Italy
Number-one singles in Switzerland
Male–female vocal duets
Songs written by Giorgio Moroder
Songs written by Tom Whitlock
1990 FIFA World Cup
Warner Records singles
Sugar Music singles
Virgin Records singles